The denticle herring (Denticeps clupeoides) is a small, up to  long, species of ray-finned fish found only in the rivers of Benin, Nigeria, and western Cameroon. It is related to the herrings, but notable for its large anal fin and its array of denticle-like scales under the head, which give it almost a furry appearance. It is the sole living member of  the family Denticipitidae.

See also
List of fish families

References
 
 P. H. Greenwood, The osteology and relationships of the Denticipitidae, a family of Clupeomorph fishes (London: British Museum, 1968)

denticle herring
Freshwater fish of West Africa
denticle herring